The close-mid front rounded vowel, or high-mid front rounded vowel, is a type of vowel sound used in some spoken languages. 

The symbol is commonly referred to as "o, slash" in English.

For the close-mid front rounded vowel that is usually transcribed with the symbol , see near-close front rounded vowel.

Close-mid front compressed vowel
There is no dedicated diacritic for compression in the IPA. The spread-lip diacritic  may also be used with a rounded vowel letter  as an ad hoc symbol, but 'spread' technically means unrounded.

For the close-mid front compressed vowel that is usually transcribed with the symbol , see near-close front compressed vowel.

Features

Occurrence 
Because front rounded vowels are assumed to have compression, and few descriptions cover the distinction, some of the following may actually have protrusion.

Close-mid front protruded vowel

Catford notes that most languages with rounded front and back vowels use distinct types of labialization, protruded back vowels and compressed front vowels. However, a few, such as the Scandinavian languages, have protruded front vowels. One of them, Swedish, even contrasts the two types of rounding in front vowels (see near-close near-front rounded vowel, with Swedish examples of both types of rounding).

As there are no diacritics in the IPA to distinguish protruded and compressed rounding, an old diacritic for labialization, will be used here as an ad hoc symbol for protruded front vowels.

For the close-mid front protruded vowel that is usually transcribed with the symbol , see near-close front protruded vowel.

Acoustically, the sound is in between the more typical compressed close-mid front vowel  and the unrounded close-mid front vowel .

Features

Occurrence

See also 
 Index of phonetics articles

Notes

References

External links
 

Close-mid vowels
Front vowels
Rounded vowels